Iowa Department of Public Health (IDPH) is a state agency of Iowa focusing on public health. It is headquartered in the Lucas State Office Building in Des Moines.

References

External links
 Iowa Department of Public Health
State agencies of Iowa
State departments of health of the United States
Medical and health organizations based in Iowa